The following lists events that happened during 1958 in the Grand Duchy of Luxembourg.

Incumbents

Events

January – March
 20 January – Michel Rasquin resigns from the government to become Luxembourg's member of the inaugural European Commission, with responsibility for Transport.
 1 February – Joseph Frieden replaces Joseph Bech as Prime Minister.  He forms a new government, renewing the Christian Social People's Party's coalition with the Luxembourg Socialist Workers' Party.
 3 February – Luxembourg, Belgium, and the Netherlands sign a treaty creating the Benelux Economic Union.
 16 March – Representing Luxembourg, Solange Berry finishes ninth (and joint-last) in the Eurovision Song Contest 1958 with the song Un grand amour.

April – June
 27 April – Luxembourg's European Commissioner, Michel Rasquin, dies.
 18 June – Lambert Schaus is appointed to the European Commission, with responsibility for Transport, replacing Michel Rasquin, who died in April.

July – September
 10 July – Luxembourg signs a convention with the German state of Rhineland-Palatinate on the construction of the Vianden Pumped Storage Plant.
 19 July – Charly Gaul wins the 1958 Tour de France.
 12 August – Louis Hencks is appointed to the Council of State, replacing Albert Wagner, who resigned in July.

October – December
 31 December – Alfred Loesch resigns from the Council of State.

Births
 17 May – Pol Schmoetten, playwright
 2 June – Camille Gira, politician
 22 August – Sylvie Andrich-Duval, politician
 28 September – François Biltgen, politician
 3 October – Alex Bodry, politician

Deaths
 27 April – Michel Rasquin, politician and European Commissioner
 27 December - Batty Fischer, amateur photographer

Footnotes

References